Ilona Semkiv (born 21 September 1994) is a Ukrainian freestyle wrestler. She is a member of Ukrainian national team.

Career
Semkiv won silver medal at the 2017 European Championships in Novi Sad, Serbia. She lost in the final to ex-Ukrainian Mariya Stadnyk from Azerbaijan.

References

1994 births
Living people
Ukrainian female sport wrestlers
20th-century Ukrainian women
21st-century Ukrainian women